The Russia–Ukraine border is the international state border between the Russian Federation and Ukraine. Over land, the border outlines five oblasts (regions) of Ukraine and five oblasts of the Russian Federation. The modern border issue has been ongoing ever since the fall of the Russian Empire in 1917.

Since early 2014, the border has been compromised due to the Russo-Ukrainian War. According to head of the State Border Guard Service of Ukraine Viktor Nazarenko, the country does not control  of the border with Russia. This stretch of land is now controlled by the Donetsk People's Republic and Luhansk People's Republic. Because of the change of control, Ukraine no longer has authority over the Kerch Strait, connection between the Kerch Peninsula on Crimea and the Taman Peninsula of Krasnodar Krai. At the same time the Russian Federation created checkpoints along the Ukrainian administrative border between Crimea and Kherson Oblast.

In 2014, the Ukrainian government unveiled a plan to build a defensive walled system along the border with Russia, named "Project Wall". It would cost almost $520 million, take four years to complete, and has been under construction as of 2015.

On 1 January 2018, Ukraine introduced biometric controls for Russians entering the country. On 22 March 2018, President of Ukraine Petro Poroshenko signed a decree that required Russian citizens to notify the Ukrainian authorities in advance about their reason for traveling to Ukraine. On 7 November 2018, the Criminal Code of Ukraine was amended to make illegal crossing of the border into Ukraine "to harm the country's interest" punishable by imprisonment for up to three years.

Since 30 November 2018, Ukraine has banned all Russian men between 16 and 60 from entering the country with exceptions for humanitarian purposes.

Since 1 March 2020, Ukrainians crossing the border from Ukraine to Russia need to use their "international passport". However, Ukrainians who return to Ukraine can do this using an "internal passport".

History before 1991

Dissolution of the Russian Empire

The border has inherited its location from the administrative-territorial division between the Ukrainian SSR and the Russian SFSR. The first real demarcation took place in May 1918 in Kursk. After the fall of the Russian Empire, several factions sought to create an independent Ukrainian state, alternately cooperating and struggling against each other. Most of Ukraine (Ukrainian People's Republic) was overrun by the Red Guards of Soviet Russia. With the help of the Central Powers, Ukraine managed to recover all its territories of "Ukrainian governorates" and also annexed a number of neighboring counties of Kursk and Voronezh governorates where the ethnic composition of the population was predominantly Ukrainophone (Ukrainian-speaking).<ref name=borders_ukraine>Yefimenko, H. About the border between Soviet Ukraine and the Bolshevik Russia, 1919. Ukrayinska Pravda (Historic pravda). 10 March 2014</ref> On 6 May 1918, a ceasefire agreement was signed in Konotop between Ukraine and Soviet Russia. Between the fighting sides a neutral territory between 10 and 40 km wide was established to prevent further aggression, but the Russian side decided to create guerrilla forces which were transformed into two "Ukrainian divisions" (see Nikolay Shchors).

On June 12, 1918, the sides signed a preliminary peace treaty. Further negotiations stalled due to a lack of consensus on the issue of the borders. The Ukrainian side was proposing an ethnic principle based on the already established political, geographical, and economic aspects, while the Russian side insisted on conducting a plebiscite in each populated place. On 22 June 1918, both sides finally agreed to go along with the Ukrainian proposition, while any contested issues would be decided by plebiscite. Yet any further negotiations led nowhere and were terminated by the Ukrainian delegation in October 1918 as it was becoming apparent that the Russian was using their time more for the pro-Soviet propaganda.

International border with Don republic
More productive were negotiations between the Don Republic and Ukraine that started soon after the Don Republic formed its government on 16 May 1918. The Don side was presented by the Minister of trade Vladimir Lebedev and the Ambassador of Don to Ukraine General Aleksandr Cheriachukin, while the Ukrainian side - by the Minister of Foreign Affairs Dmytro Doroshenko.

On 8 August 1918, the sides signed the treaty "About Basic Principles of Bilateral Relations", wherein each side agreed to renounce its territorial contests against the other, and borders were established based on the gubernatorial division of the Russian Empire. The Don-Ukraine border outlined the Oblast of Don Host to the west of the Don Republic and Yekaterinoslav, Kharkiv, Voronezh guberniyas to the east of Ukraine. To Ukraine also was ceded some territory of the right bank of the Kalmius river just east of Mariupol "to ensure the proper administration of the city and port". On September 18, 1918, between Don and Ukraine the Don-Ukrainian Commission was created for the administration of the Taganrog Industrial District, based in Kharkiv.

Second invasion by Soviet Russia

After the second invasion of the Soviet troops during the Russian Civil War in 1919, the new Soviet government of Ukraine intended to retain all territorial gains of the Ukrainian national government (Ukrainian State). However, after several rounds of negotiations, the border between the "Ukrainian governorates" (Chernihiv and Kharkiv) and the "Russian governorates" (Bryansk and Kursk) was left intact. It also was agreed that Ukraine would border Crimea at the Perekop Isthmus. On March 10, 1919, a border treaty was signed between the Russian SFSR and the Ukrainian SSR.

On April 24, 1919, the Ukrainian SSR was stripped of four counties of the Chernihiv Governorate that on the unilateral decision of the People's Commissariat of Foreign Affairs of the Russian SFSR were transferred to the newly created Gomel Governorate. On April 28, 1919, the Central Committee of the Communist Party of Ukraine simply acknowledged it.

After the USSR was formally created in 1922 and due to the onset of the administrative division reform, issues emerged. The Ukrainian government claimed mainly some parts of the Kursk and Voronezh gubernia, which were home to a Ukrainian-speaking population. As a result of the border dispute of the 1920s, Ukraine was granted approximately one-third of the claimed territories, while the Taganrog and Shakhty districts went back to the RSFSR. By 1927, the administrative border between the RSFSR and Ukrainian SSR was established.

1954 transfer of Crimea
In 1954, First Secretary of the Communist Party of the Soviet Union Nikita Khrushchev transferred the peninsula of Crimea from the Russian SFSR to the Ukrainian SSR. This event was viewed as an insignificant "symbolic gesture", as both republics were a part of the Soviet Union and answerable to the government in Moscow. Crimean autonomy was re-established after a referendum in 1991, 11 months prior to the dissolution of the Soviet Union.

 History since 1991 

In 1991, Ukraine as a new independent state inherited the territory and the boundaries of the former Ukrainian SSR. At the time the Russia–Ukraine border was an administrative line, which was not delimited nor demarcated. Ukraine has been trying to establish a proper border since.

1994 Budapest Memorandum on Security Assurances
The Budapest Memorandum on Security Assurances refers to three identical political agreements signed at the OSCE conference in Budapest, Hungary on 5 December 1994.  Among other things, the Memorandum promised that its signatories (the Russian Federation, the United States of America, and the United Kingdom) would respect Ukraine's existing borders.

 Border treaty 
The Treaty Between the Russian Federation and Ukraine on the Russian-Ukrainian State Border was signed by President Leonid Kuchma of Ukraine and President Vladimir Putin of the Russian Federation on 28 January, 2003. It defined the entire land border between the two states, except for the point where it met the Belarusian border, which was agreed in a separate treaty. It was ratified by both states, and entered into force on  23 April 2004. However, maritime border wasn't delimitated over controversy concerning the waters of the Azov Sea and the Kerch Strait.

 Tuzla incident 

The island Tuzla Spit became a major dispute between Russia and Ukraine in 2003. The island is located in the Kerch Strait and administratively it is part of Crimea, Ukraine. During the Soviet period, the island along with Crimea was transferred to Ukraine in 1954; the fact which was also fiercely contested by several Russian politicians was the legal background of the territorial change.

The main trade routes lay completely within the deeper part of the Kerch Strait which is located between the island and Crimea and is considered a part of the territorial waters of Ukraine. On the other hand, ships are impeded to travel to the east of the island (towards the Taman peninsula) due to the fact that there are shallow waters. Fishing spawn also mainly takes place in the territorial waters of Ukraine, which is favorable for the fishing industry of Crimea. The intensity of the conflict increased due to the forecast of locations of oil and gas in the area and the lack of an established and ratified international border between Russia and Ukraine. On the proposition of the Russian side, it was offered for the border to stretch along the bed of the territorial waters while sharing the use of the Azov Sea and Kerch Strait waters.

 Crimean status dispute (2014)
Since the March 2014 annexation of Crimea by Russia, the status of the Crimea and of the city of Sevastopol is currently under dispute between Russia and Ukraine; Ukraine, and the majority of the international community, consider the Crimea to be an autonomous republic of Ukraine, and Sevastopol to be one of Ukraine's cities with special status. Russia, on the other hand, considers the Crimea to be a federal subject of Russia and Sevastopol to be one of Russia's three federal cities. Since 1991, Russia also leases Sevastopol Naval Base with the current lease extending to the 2040s with an option for another extension, but the Russian State Duma approved the denunciation of this lease agreements unanimously by 433 members of parliament on 31 March 2014.

Borders of the Russian Naval Base, in the city of Sevastopol, and its vicinity have not been clearly identified.

In December 2018, Russia announced it completed the construction of the 60-km barrier across Perekop Isthmus between Ukraine and Crimea.

 Restrictions for Russians entering Ukraine (since 2018) 
On 1 January 2018, Ukraine introduced biometric controls for Russians entering the country. On 22 March 2018, President of Ukraine Petro Poroshenko signed a decree that required Russian citizens and "individuals without citizenship, who come from migration risk countries” (more details were not given) to notify the Ukrainian authorities in advance about their reason for traveling to Ukraine.

On 7 November 2018, the Criminal Code of Ukraine was amended to make an illegal crossing of the border into Ukraine "to harm the country's interest" punishable by imprisonment for up to three years. This refers to persons who are denied entry to Ukraine and members of units of the Russian armed forces or other law enforcement agencies, who try to cross the state border of Ukraine by any means beyond official checkpoints or at checkpoints without proper travel documents or documents containing inaccurate information. The same acts committed repeatedly or by a group of persons will entail imprisonment from three to five years. Imprisonment from five to eight years is foreseen for committing these acts combined with violence or the use of weapons.

Since 30 November 2018, Ukraine bans all Russian men between 16 and 60 from entering the country with exceptions for humanitarian purposes. Ukraine claims this is a security measure to prevent Russia from forming units of “private” armies on Ukrainian soil.

 2022 invasion 

On 24 February 2022, Russian forces crossed the border in a full-scale invasion of Ukraine. Russian forces also entered Ukraine from Belarus and the disputed Crimean Peninsula.

On 4 and 5 April 2022, units of the State Border Guard Service of Ukraine retook control of their border crossing in Chernihiv Oblast. On 4 April, Sumy Oblast's Governor Dmytro Zhyvytskyi stated that Russian troops no longer occupied any towns or villages in Sumy Oblast and had mostly withdrawn, while Ukrainian troops were working to push out the remaining units.

On 1 July 2022, Ukraine made it compulsory for Russian citizens to apply for a visa to enter Ukraine. During the first four months of the visa regime, ten visas were issued and seven Russian citizens entered Ukraine (mostly for humanitarian reasons).

Security checkpoints

, BBC News, 18 February 2015. This stretch of land is now controlled by organizations better known as Donetsk People's Republic and Luhansk People's Republic.

According to the State Border Guard Service of Ukraine the number of Russian citizens who crossed the border with Ukraine (more than 2.5 million Russians in 2014) dropped by almost 50% in 2015. They also refused entry into Ukraine to 16,500 citizens of Russia in 2014 and to 10,800 Russians in 2015. According to the State Border Guard there were 1.5 million trips by Russians to Ukraine in 2017.

Luhansk Oblast
 Zolote, near Zolote towards Pervomaisk

Donetsk Oblast
 Mayorske, near train station Mayorska, Horlivka
 Maryinka, near Maryinka (along Highway H15)

Geography
The Russia–Ukraine border has the biggest number of border checkpoints in Ukraine.

Demarcation
A treaty on the demarcation of the common border between the foreign ministers of Ukraine and Russia was signed on 17 May 2010 and came into force on 29 July of the same year. At that time, Ukraine intended to start work on the demarcation of the border upon ratification of the agreement by the respective governments, but ratification was not completed.  However 16 June 2014 the National Security and Defense Council of Ukraine ordered the government to carry out a one-side demarcation of the border "in terms of existing threats to national security"; amidst the worst fighting of the 2014 pro-Russian conflict in Ukraine.

Ukrainian Wall

Since May 2015, Ukraine is building a fortified border barrier on the Russia–Ukraine border, popularly known as the "Yatseniuk's Wall". The project aims to prevent Russian military and hybrid warfare intervention in Ukraine.

As of May 2015, a walled defense system was under construction along the Russian border in Kharkiv Oblast. The project was planned to be finished in 2018. In June 2020 the State Border Guard of Ukraine expected that the project would be finished by 2025. However, the construction was stopped when Russia invaded Ukraine in February 2022.

Road border checkpoints

Chernihiv – Bryansk
The section of the border between the Chernihiv Oblast and Bryansk Oblast has length of .Notes: 3 – three-way checkpoint with Belarus

Sumy – Bryansk

Sumy – KurskNotes: 1 – closed for nighttime
 2 – under renovations

Sumy – BelgorodNotes:''
 1 – closed for nighttime

Kharkiv – Belgorod

 Hoptivka – Nekhoteyevka
 Kozacha Lopan – Dolbino
 Odnorobivka – Golovchino
 Oleksandrivka – Bezymeno
 Pisky – Logachovka
 Pletenivka – Shebekino
 Strilecha – Zhuravlyovka
 Topoli – Valuiki
 Chuhunivka – Verigovka

Luhansk – Belgorod
Adrian Lagmay - Trestan Baldoza

Luhansk – Voronezh
 Prosyane – Bugayevka

Railroad border checkpoints

Sumy Oblast
 Konotop Rail Station (Konotop)
 Vorozhba Rail Station (Vorozhba)
 Khutir-Mykhailivsky Rail Station (Druzhba)
 Zernove Rail Station (Zernove)
 Volfine Rail Station (Volfine)
 Pushkarne Rail Station (Pushkarne)

Kharkiv Oblast
 Vovchansk Rail Station (Vovchansk)
 Kupyansk Rail Station (Kupyansk)
 Kharkiv-Passenger Rail Station (Kharkiv)
 Kharkiv-Sorting Rail Station (Kharkiv)

Closed border checkpoints
Since the Russo-Ukrainian War, the following border checkpoints were shut down.

Chernihiv – Bryansk
 Klyusy (local?)

Sumy – Bryansk
 Sopych status is uncertain, could be same as Bachivsk

Sumy – Kursk
 Boyaro-Lezhachi – Tyotkino (local)
 Kondrativka – Yelizovetovka (local)
 Novovasylivka – Belaya Beryozka (local)
 Ryzhivka – Tyotkino (local)
 Starykove – Kozino (local)
 Volfine – Volfino (local)
 Volodymyrivka (local?)

Sumy – Belgorod
 Popivka (local?) (uncertain whether of Velyka Pysarivka or Krasnopillia raions)

Kharkiv – Belgorod
 Budarky – Tishanka (local)

Luhansk – Belgorod
 Dyomino-Oleksandrivka – Valuiky (interstate)

Luhansk – Voronezh
 Novobila – Novobila (interstate)

Luhansk – Rostov
 Dovzhansky– Novoshakhtinsk (international)
 Herasymivka – Mozhayevka (local)
 Izvaryne – Donetsk (special status, international)
 Krasna Talivka – Voloshinoye (international)
 Milove – Chertkovo (local)
 Yuhanivka – Yelan (local)
 Chervona Mohyla – Gukovo (rail international)
 Izvaryne – Donetsk (special status, rail international)
 Milove - Chertkovo (rail international)
 Chervonopartyzansk – Gukovo (international)
 Syevyerny – Donetsk (local)
 Krasnodarsky – Donetsk (local)
 Krasnodarsky – Nizhni Shvyrov (local)
 Novoborovtsi – Alekseyevo-Tuzlovka (local)
 Oleksandrivka – Titovka (local)
 Vilkhove – Quarry of 122 km (interstate)
 Zarynivka – Tarasovo-Melovskoye (local)

Donetsk – Rostov
 Passengers Park (Ilovaisk) – Uspenka (rail international)
 Southern Park (Ilovaisk) – Uspenka (rail international)
 Kvashyne – Uspenka (international)
 Marynivka – Kuibyshevo (international)
 Novoazovsk – Veselo-Voznesensk (international)
 Ulianivske – Shramko (local)
 Uspenka – Matveyev Kurgan (international)

Crimea – Krasnodar

 Port Krym (Kerch Strait ferry line) – Port Kavkaz
 Sevastopol, while containing a naval base of the Black Sea Fleet of Russian Federation, there were no borders demarcated within the city. Instead, the whole city was granted the special status and without a full-fledged mayor position.

Local border traffic

Since 16 March 2015, the Russia-Ukraine local border traffic agreement was unilaterally terminated by Ukraine citing national security.

On 24 March 2015, the Ukrainian side informed that Russia temporarily froze the local border traffic within the territory of Kharkiv, Sumy and Luhansk regions of Ukraine adjacent to Belgorod and Voronezh regions of the Russian Federation. Local BCPs “Zhuravlivka” and “Oleksandrivka” (Kharkiv region) were the exceptions.

Simplified local border crossing was allowed for the 2015 Easter holidays in Stanichno-Lugansk, Melovskoy, Troitsky, Novopskovsky and Belovodsky districts of the Luhansk Oblast.

See also
 Borders of Russia
 Borders of Ukraine
 Russia–Ukraine relations

References

 
Borders of Russia
Borders of Ukraine
Russia–Ukraine relations
1991 establishments in Ukraine
1991 establishments in Russia
International borders
Internal borders of the Soviet Union